Eighteen ships of the Royal Navy have borne the name Hunter:

  was a dogger captured in 1646 and sold in 1649.
  was a 10-gun fire ship, previously the French sloop Chasseur, captured in 1652.  She was burnt in 1653.
  was a 6-gun Royalist vessel, captured by the Parliamentarians in 1656.  She foundered in 1661.
  was a 30-gun fifth rate captured from the Dutch in 1672.  She was on the Navy List until 1677.
  was a 4-gun sloop launched in 1673 and sold in 1683.
  was an 8-gun fire ship launched in 1690.  She was rebuilt as a 24-gun sixth rate in 1710 and was captured by the Spanish later that year.
  was a 10-gun fire ship purchased in 1739 and renamed HMS Vulcan in 1740.  She was hulked in 1743.
  was a 10-gun sloop launched in 1756. Hunter was declared unfit for service and sold in 1780.
  was an 8-gun cutter purchased in 1763 and sold in 1771.
  was a 16-gun sloop purchased, one of three ordered from builders in Bermuda in 1796 (the others being HMS Dasher and HMS Driver). She was launched in 1796, and wrecked in 1797.
  was an 18-gun brig-sloop purchased in 1801 and broken up in 1809.
  was a 10-gun brig launched in 1805 and captured by the Americans in 1813.
  was a  wood screw gunboat launched in 1856. She was placed on the sale list in 1869 and was sold in 1884.
  was a  launched in 1895 and sold in 1912.
  was an H-class destroyer launched in 1936 and sunk in 1940.
She was returned to the US Navy in 1945.
She was renamed HMS Hunter in 1947, and transferred to the Ministry of Transport in 1956, being renamed . She was broken up in 1962.
  was an  patrol and training boat launched in 1983 and sold to Lebanon in 1991.

See also
 , a Canadian Forces Naval Reserve division in Windsor, Ontario

References

Royal Navy ship names